Gallzein is a municipality in the Schwaz district in the Austrian state of Tyrol.

Geography
Gallzein lies on a terrace of the Lower Inn Valley in the foothills of the Alps.

References

Cities and towns in Schwaz District